Port of Tanjung Pelepas Highway, Federal Route 177, is a highway that connects the Port of Tanjung Pelepas interchange on the Second Link Expressway E3 to Port of Tanjung Pelepas, Johor, Malaysia. This 6.6 km (4.1 mi) highway has a motorcycle lane. The Kilometre Zero of the Federal Route 177 starts at Port of Tanjung Pelepas.

At most sections, the Federal Route 177 was built under the JKR R5 road standard, with a speed limit of 90 km/h.

List of interchanges

References

Highways in Malaysia
Malaysian Federal Roads